Jedlanka may refer to the following places:
Jedlanka, Lublin Voivodeship (east Poland)
Jedlanka, Radom County in Masovian Voivodeship (east-central Poland)
Jedlanka, Zwoleń County in Masovian Voivodeship (east-central Poland)